The Russian Women's Curling Cup are the annual national women's curling tournament in Russia. It has been held annually since season 2007―2008 (in first half of curling season, from September to December, usually 5-6 days long), organized by Russian Curling Federation. As of 2021, the event consisted of sixteen teams participating in a preliminary round robin and a single-knockout playoff.

Past champions

References

External links
Russian Curling Federation
Curling in Russia (web archive)

See also
Russian Curling Championships
Russian Women's Curling Championship

Russian Women's Curling Cup
Recurring sporting events established in 2007
National curling cups